Cony is a surname. Notable people with the surname include:

 Carlos Heitor Cony (1926–2018), Brazilian journalist and author
 Edward R. Cony (1923–2000), American journalist and newspaper executive
 Joseph S. Cony (1834–1867), United States Navy officer
 Samuel Cony (1811–1870), American politician, 31st governor of Maine

See also
 Coney (disambiguation), which includes a list of people with the surname